Lochmaben Hospital is a health facility in Woodlands Drive, Lochmaben, Dumfries and Galloway, Scotland. It is managed by NHS Dumfries and Galloway.

History 
The facility has its origins in an infectious diseases hospital which opened in May 1908. It joined the National Health Service as the Lochmaben Sanatorium in 1948. By the 1970s the sanatorium was getting old, and after a small modern facility had been built just to the south, the sanatorium closed and was demolished in 2000.

References

Further reading

Hospitals in Dumfries and Galloway
NHS Scotland hospitals
1908 establishments in Scotland
Hospitals established in 1908